Sancho de la Cerda, 1st Marquis of la Laguna, (in full), (c. 1550 – 14 November 1626) was a Spanish nobleman and diplomat.

Sancho was the third son of Don Juan de la Cerda, 4th Duke of Medinaceli and of his wife Doña Joana Manuel de Portugal. He joined the royal household, and rose to become Spanish Ambassador to Flanders, member of the council of state and of the council of war under King Philip III and later head of the household of his wife, Queen Margaret of Austria. He was rewarded with the title of Marquis of la Laguna de Camero Viejo on 16 February 1599.

Descendants
On 14 March 1578, in Madrid, Sancho de la Cerda married  Inés de Zúñiga, Lady of Villoria, Parraces, Huélamo, Toya and Silamos, daughter of Don Diego de Zúñiga, Marquis of Huelamo with whom he had no issue. After the death of his wife, he married for a second time, with María de Villena y de Mello, Lady-in-waiting to Queen Margaret of Austria, with whom he had one daughter.

By María de Villena:
 Juana de la Cerda, who married Alfonso de Alvarado, 2nd Count of Villamor

Sources

1550s births
1626 deaths
Sancho 01
Knights of the Order of Alcántara
Sancho 01
Spanish diplomats